An online catalog or online catalogue might refer to:
 The retail product offerings of an online shopping service
 An electronic library catalog